Alwyn Myburgh (born 13 October 1980 in Vanderbijlpark) is a South African hurdler.

His personal best time is 48.09 seconds, achieved at the 2001 Summer Universiade in Beijing.

Achievements

Personal bests
100 metres - 10.66 s (2002)
400 metres - 46.65 s (2002)
400 metres hurdles - 48.09 s (2001)

External links 

1980 births
Living people
People from Vanderbijlpark
South African male hurdlers
Athletes (track and field) at the 2000 Summer Olympics
Athletes (track and field) at the 2004 Summer Olympics
Athletes (track and field) at the 2008 Summer Olympics
Athletes (track and field) at the 2006 Commonwealth Games
Commonwealth Games silver medallists for South Africa
Olympic athletes of South Africa
Commonwealth Games medallists in athletics
African Games bronze medalists for South Africa
African Games medalists in athletics (track and field)
Universiade medalists in athletics (track and field)
Athletes (track and field) at the 2007 All-Africa Games
Universiade gold medalists for South Africa
Medalists at the 2001 Summer Universiade
Sportspeople from Gauteng
Medallists at the 2006 Commonwealth Games